Kim Bôi is a rural district of Hòa Bình province in the Northwest region of Vietnam. As of 2019, the district had a population of 118,767. The district covers an area of 551.03 km2. The district capital lies at Bo. It is famous for such sites as Kim Boi Hot Springs and Serena Resorts.

Administrative divisions
Kim Bôi is divided into 17 commune-level sub-divisions, including the township of Bo and 16 rural communes (Bình Sơn, Cuối Hạ, Đông Bắc, Đú Sáng, Hợp Tiến, Hùng Sơn, Kim Bôi, Kim Lập, Mỵ Hòa, Nam Thượng, Nuông Dăm, Sào Báy, Tú Sơn, Vĩnh Đồng, Vĩnh Tiến, Xuân Thủy).

References

Districts of Hòa Bình province
Hòa Bình province